The Northern Mariana Islands records in swimming are the fastest ever performances of swimmers from Northern Mariana Islands, which are recognised and ratified by the Northern Mariana Islands Swimming Federation.

All records were set in finals unless noted otherwise.

Long Course (50 m)

Men

Women

Mixed relay

Short Course (25 m)

Men

Women

References

External links
 NMI Swimming Federation official web site

Northern Mariana Islands
Records
Swimming